Sebek was an ancient Egyptian deity.

Sebek may also refer to:

People
 Sebek Khu, Pharoanic Egyptian man honoured by the Sebek-khu Stele
 Jan Šebek (born 1991) Czech soccer player
 Josef Šebek (born 1888) Bohemian tennis player
 Lukáš Šebek (born 1988) Slovak soccer player
 Nick Sebek (1927-2007) U.S. NFL American football player
 Zdeněk Šebek (born 1959) Czech paralympic archer

Sebek crocodilians
 Sebecus (genus)
 Sebecidae (subfamilia)
 Sebecia (familia)
 Sebecosuchia (suprafamilia)

Other uses
 SS Sebek(1909), shipwrecked in October 1916
 Sebek The Crocodile God, a fictionalized version of the god by H.P. Lovecraft, see Cthulhu Mythos deities
 Sebek (Stargate Novels), a fictionalized version of the god in Stargate

See also

 Zebec (disambiguation)
 Sebec (disambiguation)
 Sobek (disambiguation)
 
 
 Sayabec, Gaspesie, Quebec, Canada
 Sayabec station, train station